4-Bromoaniline is a compound where an aniline molecule is substituted with a bromine atom on the para position. Commercially available, this compound may be used as a building block, e.g. in the preparation of p-bromobiphenyl via the Gomberg-Bachmann reaction.

Synthesis 
4-bromoaniline can be made by reacting aniline with bromine with a protection with acetyl chloride.

References 

Anilines
Bromoarenes